The East Liverpool City School District is a public school district serving the communities of East Liverpool, La Croft, Glenmoor, and Liverpool Township in southeastern Columbiana County in the U.S. state of Ohio.

All sports teams are nicknamed the Potters, and the district's colors are blue and white.

Current schools

Historic schools no longer in operation by the school district

Timeline

References

Education in Columbiana County, Ohio
School districts in Ohio
Public schools in Ohio